Spiring is an English surname. Notable people with the surname include:

 Gordon Spiring (1918–1997), English footballer
 Peter Spiring (born 1950), English footballer
 Reuben Spiring (born 1974), English cricketer

References 

English toponymic surnames